Barstow is a city in San Bernardino County, California, in the Mojave Desert of Southern California. Located in the Inland Empire region of California, the population was 25,415 at the 2020 census. Barstow is an important crossroads for the Inland Empire and home to Marine Corps Logistics Base Barstow.

History

The settlement of Barstow began in the late 1840s in the Mormon Corridor. Every fall and winter, as the weather cooled, the rain produced new grass growth and replenished the water sources in the Mojave Desert. People, goods, and animal herds would move from New Mexico and later Utah to Los Angeles, along the Old Spanish Trail from Santa Fe, or after 1848, on the Mormon Road from Salt Lake City. Trains of freight wagons traveled back to Salt Lake City and other points in the interior. These travelers followed the course of the Mojave River, watering and camping at Fish Ponds on its south bank (west of Nebo Center) or 3.625 miles up river on the north bank, at a riverside grove of willows and cottonwoods, festooned with wild grapes, called Grapevines (later the site of North Barstow). In 1859, the Mojave Road followed a route that was established from Los Angeles to Fort Mojave through Grapevines that linked eastward with the Beale Wagon Road across northern New Mexico Territory to Santa Fe.

Trading posts were established at Grapevines and Fish Ponds that supplied travelers on the roads and increasingly the miners that came into the Mojave Desert after the end of hostilities with the native people.

Barstow's roots also lie in the rich mining history of the Mojave Desert following the discovery of gold and silver in the Owens Valley and in mountains to the east in the 1860s and 1870s. Due to the influx of miners arriving in Calico and Daggett, railroads were constructed to transport goods and people. The Southern Pacific built a line from Mojave, California through Barstow to Needles in 1883. In 1884, ownership of the line from Needles to Mojave was transferred to the Santa Fe Railroad. Paving the major highways through Barstow led to further development of the city. Much of its economy depends on transportation. Before the advent of the interstate highway system, Barstow was an important stop on both Routes 66 and 91. The two routes met in downtown Barstow and continued west together to Los Angeles.

Barstow is named after William Barstow Strong, former president of the Atchison, Topeka and Santa Fe Railway. Some early Barstow names were Camp Sugarloaf, Grapevine, Waterman Junction and Fishpond.

Geography

Climate

Barstow experiences an arid climate, and has four seasons. Summer days are very hot, with highs typically exceeding . Winter, in contrast, is characterized by cold mornings, with lows near . Daily temperature ranges are largely a result of the low atmospheric moisture, typically between  difference.

Snowfall is uncommon in winter, and many years can go by without any measurable snowfall. There are an average of 24 days annually with measurable precipitation.

Vegetation
The native vegetation is dominated by high and low desert shrubs such as creosote bush. City residents have introduced many non-native plants, prominent among which are trees such as Aleppo pine, Morus alba, Italian cypress, fan palm, ailanthus, ash, palo verde and redbud.

Demographics

2010

The 2010 United States Census reported that Barstow had a population of 22,639. The  makeup of Barstow was 11,840 (52.3%) White (34.2% Non-Hispanic White), 3,313 (14.6%) African American, 477 (2.1%) Native American, 723 (3.2%) Asian, 278 (1.2%) Pacific Islander, 4,242 (18.7%) from other races, and 1,766 (7.8%) from two or more ethnicities/cultures. Hispanic or Latino of any race were 9,700 persons (42.8%).

The Census reported that 22,271 people (98.4% of the population) lived in households, 195 (0.9%) lived in non-institutionalized group quarters, and 173 (0.8%) were institutionalized.

There were 8,085 households, out of which 3,196 (39.5%) had children under the age of 18 living in them, 3,182 (39.4%) were married couples living together, 1,619 (20.0%) had a female householder with no husband present, 612 (7.6%) had a male householder with no wife present. There were 701 (8.7%) unmarried partnerships, and 58 (0.7%) same-sex married couples or partnerships, while 2,174 households (26.9%) were made up of individuals, and 670 (8.3%) had someone living alone who was 65 years of age or older. The average household size was 2.75. There were 5,413 families (67.0% of all households); the average family size was 3.34.

The population was spread out, with 6,739 people (29.8%) under the age of 18, 2,481 people (11.0%) aged 18 to 24, 5,723 people (25.3%) aged 25 to 44, 5,277 people (23.3%) aged 45 to 64, and 2,419 people (10.7%) who were 65 years of age or older. The median age was 31.1 years. For every 100 females, there were 99.6 males.  For every 100 females age 18 and over, there were 94.9 males.

The homeowner vacancy rate was 5.0%; the rental vacancy rate was 16.0%. 10,829 people (47.8% of the population) lived in owner-occupied housing units and 11,442 people (50.5%) lived in rental housing units.

During 2009–2013, Barstow had a median household income of $42,354, with 26.2% of the population living below the federal poverty line.

2000
As of the census of 2000, there were 21,119 people, 7,647 households, and 5,253 families residing in the city. The population density was 628.8 inhabitants per square mile (242.8/km2).

The racial makeup of the city was 57.1% White, 11.6% African American, 2.4% Native American, 3.1% Asian, 1.0% Pacific Islander, 18.4% from other races, and 6.5% from two or more races. 36.5% of the population were Hispanic, Latino or Latin American of any race.

There were 7,647 households, out of which 36.7% had children under the age of 18 living with them, 45.4% were married couples living together, 17.7% had a female householder with no husband present, and 31.3% were non-families. Of all households, 25.9% were made up of individuals, and 8.5% had someone living alone who was 65 years of age or older. The average household size was 2.7 and the average family size was 3.3.

In the city, the population was spread out, with 30.8% under the age of 18, 10.4% from 18 to 24, 27.4% from 25 to 44, 19.3% from 45 to 64, and 12.1% who were 65 years of age or older. The median age was 32 years. For every 100 females, there were 99.6 males. For every 100 females age 18 and over, there were 97.1 males.

The median income for a household in the city was $35,069, and the median income for a family was $40,160. Males had a median income of $37,425 versus $25,380 for females. The per capita income for the city was $16,132. About 15.6% of families and 20.3% of the population were below the poverty line, including 30.8% of those under age 18 and 4.3% of those age 65 or over.

Arts and culture

Barstow has a series of murals along Main Street, depicting scenes from the city's history. These murals were created by Main Street Murals, a local non-profit organization.

Barstow Branch Library is located at 304 E. Buena Vista Street. It is a community venue, running various activities such as a summer reading program for children, story and craft sessions as well as a mystery book club.

Entertainment
Skyline Drive-In, a drive-in theater located in the north-east outskirts of the city at 31175 Old Highway 58, is one of the last operating in San Bernardino County. It has two screens; each screen shows two movies every night.

Hollywood Theatre Barstow Cinema 6 is the city's indoor cinema. It has six screens and can be found at 1503 East Main Street, in the east side of the city. As of September 30, 2011, Skyline Drive-In took over Hollywood Theatre, changing its name back to Barstow Station Cinema.

Barstow Community College has a $22 million Performing Arts Center which hosts college theatre and music performances, and traveling professional performances.

Museums

Barstow has a number of museums: Mojave River Valley Museum, Route 66 Mother Road Museum, the Western America Rail Museum, and the Desert Discovery Center. Once a year a family opens their Black History collection to the public and nearby Fort Irwin is home to the 11 Cavalry and ACR Museum. The Old Woman meteorite, the largest meteorite found in California and the second largest in the United States, is housed in the Desert Discovery Center.

The Casa Del Desierto, built in 1911 as a Harvey House hotel and train station, now houses the Route 66 Mother Road Museum, the Western America Railroad Museum and still functions as an (unstaffed) Amtrak station. The Barstow Chamber of Commerce sponsors an annual sandcastle contest in the dry riverbed across from the Harvey House.

Restaurants

Barstow Station
Opened in 1975 and operating 365 days a year, Barstow Station is built to resemble a railway station. The location serves 20,000 tour buses a year and is a popular stop for travelers on Interstate 15. It includes a number of gift shops, an ice cream parlour, a Panda Express, Popeyes Louisiana Kitchen, KHWY radio station, and a Greyhound ticket terminal. In November 2013, Dunkin' Donuts opened inside Barstow Station, becoming only the second location of that chain within the entire state of California (following a shop on Camp Pendleton) and the first to be accessible to the general public.

The McDonald's restaurant at Barstow Station consists of three side-by-side railroad cars—a reference to Barstow's railroad heritage. In September 1986, the restaurant was destroyed by fire when a customer's car burst into flames at the drive-up window. In June 1997, the re-built restaurant received national attention when a gunman opened fire during a botched robbery, injuring several people and killing a nine-year-old girl. The gunman was mortally wounded by an off-duty police officer after the ensuing gun battle and later died in a hospital.

Other
Other casual dining options include: In-N-Out Burger, Starbucks, IHOP, Denny's, and Jack in the Box. The oldest still operating franchise of Del Taco restaurant can be found at 401 N. First Street. Barstow is also home to several privately owned restaurants, such as DiNapoli's Firehouse: Italian Eatery, Canton Restaurant, and Los Domingos.

Shopping
Located southwest of the town is the upscale Tanger Center Barstow, of the Tanger Factory Outlet Centers chain, which is a popular stop for tourists traveling between Greater Los Angeles and Las Vegas. An older shopping center of outlet stores, the Barstow Factory Outlet, is located opposite the Tanger Outlet Center.

The city has an enclosed shopping mall, Barstow Mall, built in the 1970s. It was renovated in 2010 and now includes the County of San Bernardino's new social service office for the Transition Assistance Department and Children and Family Services.

Barstow also has stores such as Walmart, Stater Bros., Food 4 Less, 99 Cents Only Stores, Marshalls, The Home Depot, and Harbor Freight Tools.

Near Barstow
The United States Army’s National Training Center (NTC) and NASA's Goldstone Deep Space Communications Complex are located at the nearby Fort Irwin, north of Barstow. The Goldstone Complex includes the Pioneer Deep Space Station, which has been designated a U.S. National Historic Landmark.

Calico Ghost Town is one of the few remaining original mining towns of the western United States, now preserved as a museum by Walter Knott.

Rainbow Basin is an Area of Critical Environmental Concern due to landscape features and paleontological resources in the area. The fossiliferous Barstow Formation (Miocene) is well exposed there. Rainbow Basin is managed by the Bureau of Land Management's Barstow Field Office.

Lava tubes around Pisgah Crater offer spelunking opportunities.

The Solar Project is located in Daggett, CA, about 10 miles (16 km) east of Barstow.

Sports
Barstow was home to the Barstow Riffians, a developmental semi-professional football team.  The Barstow Riffians were members of the UFAL. The team ceased operations following the 2010–11 season.

The city offers adult basketball and softball leagues.

Barstow Community College's athletics department offers four competitive intercollegiate sports programs: men's and women's basketball, baseball, and softball.

Parks and recreation
Barstow has two main parks: the Barstow Skate Park, a 12,000 square-foot skate park, and the Robert A. Sessions Memorial Sportspark, which includes six lighted ball fields, three soccer fields, volleyball courts, batting cages as well as basketball courts. The Robert A. Sessions Memorial Sportspark also plays host to regional softball tournaments.

The city also has the Dana Park Community Center open on weekdays, the Cora Harper Fitness Center and Tennis Courts open Monday to Saturday, and the outdoor Eda Henderson Pool open Tuesdays to Sundays throughout the school summer holidays.

Founded in the 1970s by two local residents, the thriving Barstow Senior Center serves Barstow's seniors. In addition to daily, weekly, and monthly activities, there is also an onsite thrift store and lunches are served every weekday. The center is funded via annual membership fees and sponsorship.

Government

Local government
According to the city's most recent Comprehensive Annual Financial Report, the city's various funds had $33.1 million in revenues, $37.2 million in expenditures, $149.8 million in total assets, $25.3 million in total liabilities, and $52.6 million in cash and investments. The structure of the management and coordination of city services is:

The Barstow Youth Advisory Council (BYAC) was established in March 2009. Thirteen teen advocates advise Barstow City Council members on the needs of young people in the city and promote youth community involvement through voluntary activities.

State and federal representation

Economy

Its long distance from larger cities and urban centers has created economic problems, and Barstow is seeking projects to boost the economy. However, there are three casinos planned for the area. Additionally, various construction projects have been announced for Barstow, which include retail growth, an increase in lodging accommodation, and other businesses.

In response, the city changed logo and it's motto to the hub of the west. It is also in the process of changing zoning in order to accommodate the logistics industry that surrounds the expanded BNSF facility

Top employers
According to the city, the top employers in the area in 2020 were:

Education

Barstow Unified School District has 8 elementary schools (grades 1–6):

Currently operating:

 Cameron Elementary School
 Crestline Elementary School
 Henderson Elementary School
 Lenwood Elementary School
 Montara Elementary School
 Skyline North Elementary School
 Thomson Elementary School (now Barstow Stem Academy)
Grades 7–8 are taught at Barstow Junior High School and grades 9–12 are taught at Barstow High School.

Charter Schools:
 Excelsior Charter Schools 7th-12th 
 Mojave River Academy K-12 

Barstow Community College is the only college in the area, and its primary objectives are to enable students to transfer to a four-year college or university and learn vocational trades through career technical education.

Park University has a campus located at the Marine Corps logistics base, which accepts local civilian students as well as military personnel and their dependents. Park also offers classes on the community college campus.

Closed schools:

 Hinkley Elementary School (Hinkley, California . Now closed)

Media

Newspaper, books, and radio
Founded in 1910 and renamed in 1958, the Desert Dispatch is Barstow's local newspaper. The newspaper has a daily circulation of 3,259 and was awarded second place for Sports Page Design, Opinion Page Design and Editorial Comment at the 2008 Better Newspapers Contest, hosted by the California Newspaper Publishers Association.

Barstow's main radio station is KDUC (or "K-DUCK"), which plays adult contemporary music and also serves Victorville, Apple Valley, Hesperia and Ridgecrest, California.

"We were somewhere around Barstow on the edge of the desert when the drugs began to take hold" is the opening sentence of Hunter S. Thompson's Fear and Loathing in Las Vegas.

Movies and television
Barstow City Council has a dedicated film office, which acts as a point of liaison and resources for film locations, equipment and accommodation for filmmakers and their crews. A number of notable motion pictures were shot in the city, including Broken Arrow, Courage Under Fire, From Dusk till Dawn, Gattaca, Erin Brockovich, and Kill Bill: Volume 2. Other notable mentions of Barstow include the 2008 movie Leaving Barstow, which tells the story of a high school senior who must choose between his ambitions to leave Barstow or stay in the city to care for his mother. The fictional Brian O'Conner in 2 Fast 2 Furious grew up in Barstow and travels to the city to persuade a former childhood best friend Roman Pearce to join him in an FBI operation.

The film Fear and Loathing in Las Vegas mentions Barstow frequently.

Barstow is also mentioned in the 2009 movie The Hangover before the road trip from Los Angeles to Las Vegas. The movie version of "Hair" was partially filmed in Barstow in the late 1970s.

In 2015, Barstow was one of the filming locations for the film Sky as well as Bombay Beach, Hinkley, Joshua Tree, Landers, Lenwood, Ludlow, Newberry Springs, and Victorville, California.

Barstow is the topic of the documentary Barstow, California (2018) by German director Rainer Komers featuring voice overs of Spoon Jackson's poems and memoir By Heart.

Barstow was featured by Huell Howser in Road Trip Episode 101.

Music
Barstow is mentioned in the lyrics of Route 66 composed by Bobby Troup. Sheryl Crow's "Leaving Las Vegas" mentions spending the night in Barstow.

Barstow Cowboy in Old Barstow was a 1941 song by comedian/musician Spike Jones. 

Composer Harry Partch wrote Barstow, inspired by eight pieces of graffiti written by hitchhikers on highway railings in the city.

The Residents' song "Death in Barstow" tells the story of two friends who visit and fall asleep in Barstow. One of the friends awakes to find that his friend has died.

Bill Morrissey's song "Barstow" (1984, the first song on his first record) is about a group of men drinking one night in a Barstow train yard, with the notable line "I can't believe it gets this cold in Barstow".

Goodnight, Texas's song "Barstow" is a tale of a gold miner chasing his dream to the town, only to find that Barstow does not have any gold, nor what he wants. See main chorus "Barstow Oh Barstow! Your torture isn't fair!. I left my home for riches but there ain't gold nowhere. Oh Barstow I don't know what's keepin' me around. The toughest godforsaken place that I have ever found."

Infrastructure

Transportation

Victor Valley Transit Authority is the local transportation system. It covers the city of Barstow and the surrounding areas in San Bernardino County. BAT operates three fixed city bus routes on an hourly schedule, a dial-a-ride service for seniors and persons with disabilities and two county routes serving Hinkley, Yermo, Daggett, and Newberry Springs. The county services operate on a fixed route with a deviation zone and a flexible time schedule. When requested in advance, the county bus travels off the fixed route to pick up or drop off passengers within the deviation zone.  Unless passengers hold a monthly or day pass, there is an additional charge for this service. All city and county buses connect at Barstow City Hall Transport Center. Intercity buses that serve Barstow include Greyhound, Orange Belt Stages, Intercalifornias, TUFESA, and Fronteras del Norte, and FlixBus.

The Harvey House Railroad Depot is served twice daily by Amtrak's Southwest Chief, from Chicago to Los Angeles and reverse. Connections can also be made on multiple Amtrak Thruway Motorcoach bus services to Las Vegas and other destinations. Rail freight is provided by the BNSF Railway and the Union Pacific Railroad.

Barstow-Daggett Airport is the local airport that serves general aviation but has no commercial service.

Roads are the main method of transport. The primary arteries serving Barstow are Interstate 40, Interstate 15, and California State Route 58. A Tesla Supercharger station is available.

Healthcare
Barstow Community Hospital is a 56-bed hospital serving the surrounding High Desert community. Opened in 1958, the hospital was named one of the "100 Top Hospitals in the Nation" for two consecutive years in the late 1990s.The new Barstow Community Hospital, which opened its doors to the community in October 2012, is a 30-bed acute care facility with inpatient and outpatient services, and medical, surgical and emergency care.

Public safety
Barstow has its own police department, plus a regional station of the San Bernardino County Sheriff's Department, which serves the unincorporated areas around the city, including Newberry Springs, Trona, Baker and Ludlow.

Fire prevention and paramedic services are provided by the Barstow Fire Protection District.

On November 19, 2010, Barstow residents were warned that the area water system was contaminated. A local area military base, Marine Corps Logistics Base Barstow notified Golden State Water that samples taken from their water system showed the chemical perchlorate at levels above the maximum contaminant level of 6 parts per billion. Perchlorate is found in rocket propellant, fireworks, explosives, flares, matches and industrial byproducts. Golden State Water Co. handed out free bottled water to residents. The "Do Not Drink" water advisory ended five days later on November 24, 2010.

Cemetery
The Mountain View Memorial Park (also called Mt. View Cemetery), located on Irwin Road, was established in 1937; an Independent Special District for the cemetery was created in 1947. Notable burials include MLB pitcher Bob Rhoads.

Notable people
 Nick Barnett, former NFL player for Green Bay Packers and Washington Redskins
 Raquel Beezley, Miss California USA 2008
 Jeanne Crain, Academy Award-nominated film actress
 Dino Ebel, Major League Baseball coach
 Jeremy Gable, playwright
 T. J. Houshmandzadeh, former football player for Cincinnati Bengals and Seattle Seahawks
 Spoon Jackson, convicted murderer and poet
 Mark Johnson, golfer
 Byron Katie, author, speaker
 Joe A. Martinez, ring and cage announcer
 Michael Pelkey, founder of BASE Jumping
 Scott Reeder, drummer, Fu Manchu
 Stan Ridgway, musician, founder of Wall of Voodoo
 Ross Robinson, music producer
 Gloria J. Romero, former majority leader, California State Senate
 Paul Salopek, journalist
 Aaron Sanchez, MLB pitcher for San Francisco Giants, born in Barstow
 Rick Steves, author and television personality focusing on European travel

See also

 Calico Ghost Town
 Death Valley National Park
 Lake Dolores Waterpark
 Marine Corps Logistics Base Barstow
 Mojave Desert
 Mojave National Preserve
 Harry Partch, Barstow: Eight Hitchhikers' Inscriptions
 Solar One
 Route 66

References

External links

 

 
1947 establishments in California
Cities in the Mojave Desert
Cities in San Bernardino County, California
Incorporated cities and towns in California
Populated places established in 1947
Railway towns in California